List of Mistresses episodes may refer to: 

 List of Mistresses (British TV series) episodes, an episode list for the 2008–2010 British series
 List of Mistresses (American TV series) episodes, an episode list for the 2013–2016 U.S. series based on the UK series